Durneva Island or Dūrnev Araldary (Russian: Ostrov Durnëva) is a coastal island near the entrance of the Dead Kultuk (former Komsomolets Bay) of the eastern Caspian Sea. It is located north of the Buzachi Peninsula and 41.6 km north of Turum.

Administratively Durneva Island belongs to the Mangystau Region of Kazakhstan.

Cartography
Durneva is probably the island which appears in early maps of the Caspian Sea as Ile des Cygnes (Swan Island). The island was first accurately mapped only by Fedor Ivanovich Soimonov during the 1719 Caspian Expedition, which surveyed the Caspian Sea from 1719 to 1727.

References

External links
Caspian Sea Biodiversity Project

Islands of the Caspian Sea
Islands of Kazakhstan
Mangystau Region